Mustek Systems Inc. is a Taiwanese manufacturing company based in Hsinchu, Taiwan, established in October 1988. Its brand name is Mustek (abbreviation for Most Unique Sensible Technology).

Mustek manufacturers electro-optical and electronic devices, for example Image scanners, digital cameras, video equipment, DVD players, notebooks to power supply equipment etc. By the end of 1996, Mustek Systems has become the biggest scanner manufacturer by volume (4 million customers). The company's motto is Digital Life, Live it.

The main factory is based in Dongguan, (Guangdong province on mainland China. Subsidiaries are based in Neuss (Germany), Japan and in Irvine, CA (United States).

See also
 List of companies of Taiwan

References

External links
Official website
USA Official website

Electronics companies of Taiwan
Computer peripheral companies
Taiwanese brands
Taiwanese companies established in 1988
Technology companies established in 1988
Manufacturing companies based in Hsinchu